Bob Kurtz may refer to:

 Bob Kurtz (sportscaster), American sportscaster for the Minnesota Wild (NHL)
 Bob Kurtz (animator), director, producer, artist and designer